Sanib Puwersa is a 2011 Philippine television documentary and public service show broadcast by GMA Network. Hosted by Mel Tiangco and Arnold Clavio, it premiered on October 23, 2011 replacing Kuwentong Dabarkads. The show concluded on November 13, 2011. It was replaced by Oras Na in its timeslot.

Premise
The show features actual footages of rescue operations of emergency response teams, on-site accidents, and numerous other life-threatening situations. Tiangco visits the victims/casualties and provides assistance to help them recover from their nightmarish experiences. While Clavio goes on location to investigate and to seek solutions for the featured problems.

Episodes

Ratings
According to AGB Nielsen Philippines' Mega Manila People/Individual television ratings, the pilot episode of Sanib Puwersa earned an 8.7% rating.

References

2011 Philippine television series debuts
2011 Philippine television series endings
Filipino-language television shows
GMA Network original programming
GMA Integrated News and Public Affairs shows
Philippine documentary television series